The great ascetic Drogon Tsangpa Gyare (1161–1211) was the main disciple of Lingchen Repa Pema Dorje and the founder of the Drukpa Lineage of Tibetan Buddhism the main or central branch of which was, until the 17th Century, transmitted by his hereditary family lineage at Ralung in the Tsang region of Tibet. Later, following the birth of Gyalwang Je Kunga Paljor (1428–1476) considered to be the first of his re-incarnations, Tsangpa Gyare was held to be the first of a succession of Gyalwang Drukpa or Drukchen incarnations who, at the time of the fifth Gyalwang Drukpa Pagsam Wangpo (1593—1653), became established as the reincarnate leaders of the Drukpa lineage in Tibet.



Predictions regarding Tsangpa Gyare

Later hagiographies of Tsangpa Gyare record several verses which are said to foretell his coming. In a terma, discovered by Guru Chokyi Wangchuk (1212–1270),  it is said Guru Padmasambhava foretold the coming of Tsangpa Gyare:

At the conjoining of three valleysWhich one calls Khule Sarel – the Fissure in the Earth –An emanation of the Holder of the Jewel will manifestFrom the summit of the large rock resembling a cube,He will embark upon the teaching of the Dharma

In another terma, said to have been revealed by Terton Ratna Lingpa (1403-1478/79) and Terton Padma Lingpa (1445–1521) on different occasions, Padmasambhava is recorded as predicting:

In Druk and in RalungTsangpa Gyare will performThe magic dance of emanationOf Great Pandit Naropa.

When the famous disciple of Milarepa, Rechungpa received the teaching of Naropa’s Six Points of Equal Taste  from the Indian master Tipupa Sangag Dongpo, the master prophesied that Tsangpa Gyare would re-discover the text of the teachings.

Biographical details 

Drogon Tsangpa Gyare was born into the Gya clan at a place near Kule in the Tsang province of Southern Tibet. His father was Gya Zurpo Tsabpey and his mother Marza Darkyi. According to legend and hagiography, the child was born with his birth membrane intact, causing his parents to abandon him through fear. Whilst a giant eagle protected the vulnerable child with his wings, the new born kicked through the membrane leaving a footmark on the nearby rock.

As a young man, Drogon Tsangpa Gyare was a practitioner who studied the Sutra canon of the time, including Logic, The Way of the Bodhisattva, Metaphysics, the Transcendent Perfection of Great Wisdom and the Middle Path.

He met his Guru Lingchen Repa when he was 23.

After establishing Longbol (kLong rBol) and Ralung monasteries Drogon Tsangpa Gyare went to a place called Nam Phu to build a monastery. It is said that when he and his disciples reached the place nine roaring dragons arose from the ground and soared in the sky. The Tibetan word for dragon is 'Brug which is pronounced as 'Druk'. The flying dragons were taken to be an auspicious omen and the monastery and the lineage which sprang from it came to be known as the Drukpa. This school eventually became very popular in Tibet and surrounding regions. Many followers of this school were simple people, content with few material possessions, known for their deep practice of the dharma. There is a Tibetan proverb which says:
"Half the people are Drukpa Kagyupas,Half the Drukpa Kagyupas are beggars,And half the beggars are Drubtobs (Siddhas)."

Students

 Önre Darma Senge (dar ma sengge) [1177—1237] - nephew of Tsangpa Gyare and first of the Middle Drukpa Kagyu lineage based at Ralung.
 Zhonnu Senge (gzhon nu sengge) [1200—1266] - nephew of Tsangpa Gyare and successor of Önre Darma Senge.
 Gotsangpa Gonpo Dorje (rgod tshang pa mgon po rdo rje) [1189—1258]
 Lorepa Wangchug Tsondru (lo ras pa dbang phyug brtson 'grus) [1187—1250]
 Gyaltsha Rinchen Gon (rgyal tsha rin chen mgon) [1118—1195] - Trophu Kagyu
 Dremowa ('bras mo ba) - founder of myang stod 'bras mo dgon
 Terkungpa

Sources

References

External links 
TBRC P909
 Page on Tsangpa Gyare on His Holiness the 12th Gyalwang Drukpa's website.
 Page on Tsangpa Gyare at wiki.drukpa.com
 Biography of The First Drukchen, Tsangpa Gyare Yeshe Dorje at Treasuryoflives.org

1161 births
1211 deaths
Drukpa Kagyu lamas
Gyalwang Drukpas
Tertöns
12th-century Tibetan people
13th-century Tibetan people